Juliette Atkinson won the singles tennis title by defeating reigning champion Elisabeth Moore 6–3, 6–3, 4–6, 3–6, 6–3 in the Challenge Round of the 1897 U.S. Women's National Singles Championship, reversing the result of the previous Championships. Atkinson had won the right to challenge Moore by defeating Edith Kenderdine 6–2, 6–4, 6–0 in the final of the All Comers' competition. The event was played on outdoor grass courts and held at the Philadelphia Cricket Club in Wissahickon Heights, Chestnut Hill, Philadelphia from June 15 through June 19, 1897.

Draw

Challenge round

All Comers' finals

References

1897
1897 in American women's sports
June 1897 sports events
Women's Singles
1897 in women's tennis
Women's sports in Pennsylvania
Chestnut Hill, Philadelphia
1897 in sports in Pennsylvania